Mazars is a global audit, accounting and consulting group employing more than 42,000 professionals in more than 90 countries through member firms. With head offices in France, Mazars has a network of correspondent partners and joint ventures in a further 21 countries and is a founding member of the Praxity alliance, a network of independent firms.

Worldwide turnover for the integrated partnership for the fiscal year ending August 2014 was 1.081 billion euros. Mazars operates as a single entity as a fully integrated partnership. Mazars publicizes its consolidated financial accounts, a move it claims is unusual for private audit and advisory firms.

History 
The original Mazars firm was formed in Rouen, Normandy in France in 1945 by Robert Mazars. He would serve as chief executive officer until 1983, when Patrick de Cambourg was appointed the position. de Cambourg began internationalizing the local firm, which counted 33 employees in 1977. From 2011 to 2016, Philippe Castagnac served as chief executive officer. He was succeeded by Hervé Hélias, who currently holds the position.

Countries 
 Australia

Mazars integrated Australian audit and advisory firm Duncan Dovico on 1 January 2016. Mazars announced the acquisition of Australian-based financial modelling and training provider Corality Financial Group on 13 July 2016 to form the new team Global Infrastructure Finance.  From 1 January 2019, the Brisbane firm Hanrick Curran and the Melbourne firm Cummings Flavel McCormack both joined the global Mazars partnership, providing the Firm with an East-Coast presence in Australia.

 Brazil

As of 2002 Mazars integrated "Cabrera".  . Mazars Brazil has more than 800 professionals across 7 offices in the cities of São Paulo, Sorocaba, Barueri, Campinas, Ribeirão Preto, Rio de Janeiro and Curitiba, providing services to small, medium and large businesses.

 China

In January 2016, Mazars and Chinese firm ZhongShen ZhongHuan announced their merger, adding a further 1,800 professionals to Mazars globally, including 83 partners, from 15 offices across mainland China. 

 Czech Republic

Mazars Czech Republic was founded in 1995 and employs around 180 professionals. Mazars is, by domestic sales, the 7th biggest audit firm on the Czech market.  In 2015, the managing partner of Mazars Czech Republic was Milan Prokopius.

 France

Mazars merged with accounting firm Guérard Viala to form Mazars & Guérard in 1995.

 Ireland

In 1987, Rawlison Hunter joined forces with Mazars. Since then, Mazars has joined and merged with other firms in Ireland, and has offices in Dublin, Galway and Limerick with 30 Partners and over 500 professionals.

 Germany
In April 2015, Mazars and RBS RoeverBroennerSusat announced their merger which united about 1,000 professionals, including 68 partners and €110 million of turnover in the German market. As of 2015, Roever Broenner Susat Mazars had twelve offices in German metropolitan area.
 Greece

Mazars in Greece became fully integrated to the Mazars Group as of 1 September 2012 and is now operating under the Mazars brand with two offices in Athens and Thessaloniki and over 120 professionals.

 India

Mazars is present in India since early 2000 through its network firm Kalyaniwalla and Mistry and S. N Dhawan & Co.

 Malaysia

In 1986, Hew & Co (established in 1955) and Tan Toh Hua & Partners (established in 1958) had merged to form Hew & Tan. In the year 1999, Hew & Tan had changed their name to Moores Rowland as a rebranding exercise. On 1 September 2008, the Kuala Lumpur office of Moores Rowland merged with the global integrated structure of Mazars. To implement the merger, a new firm, Mazars (AF 001954), was registered to assume all existing mandates and statutory audit appointments of the Kuala Lumpur office of Moores Rowland.

 Netherlands

As of 2000, Mazars integrated "Paardekooper & Hoffman" (of the Netherlands), which employed more than 1000 people. In the Dutch audit market, Mazars ranks as the sixth-largest firm and contributes more than 15% of the total global turnover.

Jan Paardekooper founded Paardekooper & Hoffman in 1927. The firm worked with large clients involved in the maritime and harbour businesses of Rotterdam.

 Pakistan

In April, 2010, Mazars integrated BearingPoint into their business in Pakistan, thus adding advisory services in management and technology for sectors such as microfinance, financial services and within the public sector.

 Poland

Mazars has been operating in Poland since 1992, currently employs over 300 specialists in Warsaw and Krakow and serves more than 800 Polish and international companies of various sizes.

 Qatar

Following a prior cooperation initiated in 2008 with Ahmed Tawfik & Co. CPA, an accounting and auditing services firm in Qatar which traces its roots back to 1976, Mazars entered into an international partnership in September 2011,becoming Mazars Ahmed Tawfik & Co. CPA.

Mazars Ahmed Tawfik & Co. CPA specializes in audit, accounting, tax and advisory services and has 30 professionals in its office.

 Russia and CIS

Mazars has been present in Russia since 1995 and is an international player in the Russian market of audit and consulting services. Mazars established its presence in Russia in 1995. Today, its offices in Moscow, Saint-Petersburg and Togliatti employ over 350 professionals. The firm also has offices in Almaty (Kazakhstan), Bishkek (Kyrgyzstan) and Tashkent (Uzbekistan). The client portfolio of Mazars in Russia includes more than 600 companies. 

 Singapore

Mazars in Singapore has been present in Singapore since 1979 (as part of Moores Rowland International network of firms) and became Mazars LLP in 2009.

 South Africa

Mazars is one of the oldest audit firms in South Africa with a presence there since the early 1950s. It has over 1,000 staff, 73 Partners and 25 Directors operating out of 10 offices within South Africa. 

 Thailand

In 2007, continuing its Asian expansion, Mazars merged with the Double Impact Group in Thailand.

Since then, Mazars Thailand has grown to become the 6th-largest international professional services firm in Thailand, with over 300 consultants and 13 partners.

 Turkey

Mazars Denge was founded by two partners as Denge Denetim YMM A.S. in 1977..

 Uganda

Mazars integrated Ugandan audit and advisory firm BRJ Partners on 1 January 2018. Mazars announced the integration with BRJ partners in the annual partners meeting.

 United Kingdom

On 1 September 1998, Mazars & Guerard merged with the British accountancy firm Neville Russell and traded, in the UK, for a number of years as "Mazars Neville Russell". In 2002, "Mazars Neville Russell", as well as its counterpart firms across Europe, changed the name to become simply Mazars. Mazars currently employs 2,600 people in 15 offices in the UK; turnover is around €234m.

In April 2007, Mazars merged with the London office of MRI Moores Rowland which created a firm with turnover in the UK exceeding £90million. Mazars, prior to the  merger, was listed as the 14th-largest accountancy firm in the UK with about £65 million fee income;   following the merger and with the merger between Grant Thornton and RSM Robson Rhodes in the summer of 2007, Mazars was listed as 12th, with an estimated fee income of £90.3m. Neville Russell was founded in 1900 by Charles Neville Russell to work principally with the insurance sector of the economy. Neville Russell developed a reputation in London of being specialists in this area.

 United States
In April 2010, Mazars and Weiser, an audit and advisory firm with a strong presence in the northeastern region of the US, announced their merger, incorporating 74 Weiser partners into Mazars' international integrated partnership. 

 Vietnam

Mazars has been established in Vietnam since 1994 and employs around 160. Mazars Vietnam operates through its offices in Hanoi and Ho Chi Minh City. The managing partner of Mazars in Vietnam is Marc Deschamps, based in Ho Chi Minh City.

 Zimbabwe

In 2016, Mazars signed a correspondent agreement with KLMCA Zimbabwe.

Notable clients 

Since April 2019, US President Donald Trump's attorneys have had an ongoing controversy with a House Oversight and Reform Committee's request for some of the President's financial records which may be in the possession of Mazars USA. On 25 February 2021, the House Oversight Committee in the 117th Congress, reissued the subpoena to Mazars USA for the same documents it had previously sought.

In 2022, following the collapse of FTX, Mazars was engaged by Binance to perform an audit and report on its assets held in reserve. This was later halted following $6 billion of outflows from Binance in December 2022, before Mazars decided to suspend all work with its cryptocurrency-affiliated customers.

References 

French companies established in 1945
Accounting firms of France
Companies based in Paris
Consulting firms established in 1945
French brands
International management consulting firms
Management consulting firms of France
Management consulting firms of the United Kingdom